Harry Johnson (4 January 1899 – May 1981) was an English footballer who played as a striker for Sheffield United and Mansfield Town.

Career

Sheffield United

Johnson played for Sheffield United between 1916 and 1931. He is Sheffield United's all-time top goalscorer with 201 goals. He played his first match in United colours for a Reserve side at Heckmondwike, and upset the home fans who "displayed a certain amount of animosity," and one irate man even waved an unloaded gun at him.

Mansfield Town

He played for Mansfield Town between 1932 and 1935, for which he is also all-time top goalscorer with 114 goals in all competitions.

Personal life
His father, also known as Harry (although his birth forename was William), also played for Sheffield United and gained six caps for England. His younger brother Tom also played for the Blades for several years.

References

1899 births
1981 deaths
British Army personnel of World War I
English footballers
Association football forwards
Footballers from Sheffield
Sheffield United F.C. players
Mansfield Town F.C. players
People from Ecclesfield
FA Cup Final players